Post-classical history (also called the post-classical era) is the period of time that immediately followed the end of ancient history. Depending on the continent, the era generally falls between the years AD 200–600 and AD 1200–1500. The name of this era of history derives from classical antiquity (or the Greco-Roman era) of Europe. Though, the everyday context in use is reverse (such as historians reference to Medieval China). In European history, "post-classical" is synonymous with the medieval time or Middle Ages, the period of history from around the 5th century to the 15th century. It began with the collapse of the Western Roman Empire and merged into the Renaissance and the Age of Discovery. The Middle Ages is the middle period of the three traditional divisions of Western history: Antiquity, Medieval period, and Modern period. The Medieval period is itself subdivided into the early, high, and late Middle Ages.

Europe

North and West

South and East

Middle East and North Africa

Eurasian Steppe and Central Asia

East Asia

South and Southeast Asia

Sub-Saharan Africa

Pre-Columbian Americas

These are prehistoric states, listed either based on archaeological evidence or based on their existence at the time of European contact.

See also
 List of Bronze Age states (c. 3300–1200 BC)
 List of Iron Age states (c. 1200–600 BC)
 List of Classical Age states (c. 600 BC–200 AD)
 List of states during Late Antiquity (c. 200–700)
 List of former sovereign states
 Timeline of the Middle Ages
 List of pre-modern great powers
 List of pre-modern states

References

Middle Ages
States and territories established in the 1st millennium
States and territories established in the 2nd millennium